Asger Rye "Red" Pedersen  (sometimes Asgar Rye Pederson, born 1935, Denmark) is a former territorial-level Canadian politician. In 1953, he got a job in the Canadian Arctic with the Hudson's Bay Company (HBC) at Cambridge Bay, Nunavut (then the Northwest Territories). In the following year, he was sent to Perry River (Kuugjuak) to assist Stephen Angulalik, the Ahiarmiut Inuit owner of the trading post, with the financial records, inventory and ordering, as Angulalik spoke no English. In 1957, Angulalik sold the Perry River post to the HBC and Pedersen was appointed manager. Angulalik returned to the post after resolving legal problems and worked alongside Pedersen; they became lifelong friends. He was, at one time, married to Lena Pedersen and their grandson, Calvin Pedersen was elected to the Legislative Assembly of Nunavut in July 2020.

Public service
Ten years later, Pedersen became an area administrator for the Canadian government in Coppermine (Kugluktuk), Pangnirtung and Fort Rae (Behchoko). From 1983 to 1991, he was a member of the Northwest Territories Legislature. Pedersen was first elected to the Northwest Territories Legislature in the 1983 Northwest Territories general election, winning the Kitikmeot West electoral district. He was re-elected in the 1987 Northwest Territories general election. Pedersen was elected Speaker of the Assembly on November 12, 1987 and served that role until October 18, 1989.

In 2001, he was one of three members of the Legislative Assembly of the NWT's "Independent Commission on Members Compensation". Pedersen was a Board Member and Chairperson of the Independent Environmental Monitoring Agency until his retirement in 2003.

Pedersen retired from the Canadian Rangers, but his son and grandson continue the tradition.

In December 2013, Pedersen was acclaimed as mayor of Kugluktuk. In 2016, Pedersen was made a member of the Order of Nunavut.

References

Partial bibliography
 Pederson, Asgar Rye, and David Repp. [Canada, Northwest Territories, Coppermine Eskimos, 1965]. 1965. Sound recording.

Further reading
 Waddington, McLean & Co. An Important Sale of Inuit Art Comprising Sculptures in Stone, Bone and Ivory, Lithographs, Engravings and Stone Cut Prints, Including the "Red" Pedersen Collection, the Anne & Gerard Mulders' Collection, and Selections from Local Estates, Institutions and Individuals, to Be Sold in Two Sessions, Monday, December 14, 1981 at 7.00 P.M., Tuesday, December 15, 1981 at 7.00 P.M. Toronto: Waddington, McLean & Co, 1981.

External links
 Pedersen's early days at Perry River including recorded interviews in MP3 format.

1935 births
Living people
Members of the Legislative Assembly of the Northwest Territories
People from Kugluktuk
People from Pangnirtung
People from Behchoko
Danish emigrants to Canada
Canadian people of Danish descent
Mayors of Kugluktuk
Members of the Order of Nunavut
Members of the Order of Canada